Bedessy is a minor loa who holds the domain of the sky in Vodou and particularly in Haiti.

Haitian Vodou gods
Sky and weather gods